Sa Đéc is a Provincial city in Đồng Tháp Province in the Mekong Delta of southern Vietnam.  It is a river port and agricultural and industrial trading center. The Sa Đéc economic zone consists of Châu Thành, Lai Vung and Lấp Vò districts.

As of January 2018, the city has a population of approximately 202,046. There are three industrial zones, designated by the codes A, C1, and C. They attract many businessmen from the Mekong Delta region.

History
During the Republic of Vietnam, it was the site of Sa Đéc Base in 1966 and 1967, an American PBR (Patrol Boat, River) base during the Vietnam War. Later on, it became a Swift Boat base.

Before the nineteenth century, it was the capital of Đông Khẩu Đạo, and it was known as one of the largest cities in the Mekong Delta.

Political and administrative system
Sa Đéc has 9 subordinate administrative units:
Wards
Ward 1
Ward 2
Ward 3
Ward 4
An Hòa
Tân Quy Đông
Communes
Tân Khánh Đông
Tân Phú Đông
Tân Quy Tây

Economy
Sa Đéc Industrial Park
Sa Đéc port

In literature
The French writer Marguerite Duras lived in Sa Đéc during the three- to four-year period between 1928 and 1932. Her mother ran a school on the corner of Hùng Vương and Hồ Xuân Hương, where a school still exists today (now it is Trưng Vương Primary School). Duras met Huỳnh Thủy Lê, the son of a wealthy Chinese family, and the two became involved in a love affair that became the basis for Duras's 1984 Prix Goncourt-winning novel, The Lover. The house of Huỳnh Thủy Lê, at 255A Nguyễn Huệ Street, for many years an office for a government agency, has from 2007 been open to the public, with guides offering tours in French, English and Vietnamese.

References

External links
Sa Dec Encyclopædia Britannica
 Citypopulation.de entry (list of Vietnamese cities with populations)
 Swift Boat Coastal Base 13 page, with photos
Article in Viet News Online about the Huynh Thuy Le house.
Sa Dec Flower Village Park

Populated places in Đồng Tháp province
Districts of Đồng Tháp province
Cities in Vietnam